The football sporting event at the 1925 Far Eastern Championship Games featured matches between China, Japan and the Philippines.

Results

Winner

Statistics

Goalscorers

References

1925 in Philippine sport
Football at the Far Eastern Championship Games
International association football competitions hosted by the Philippines
1925 in Asian football